Amphora may refer to:

 Amphora, a type of ceramic vase with two handles, used for the transportation and storage of perishable goods
 Amphora (unit), a unit for measuring liquids or bulk goods in the Roman Empire
 Amphora, the at sign (@), also called asperand and ampersat
 Amphora (alga), a major genus of diatoms
 Amphora, a model of semi-closed-circuit mixture rebreather made by Aqua Lung America
 AMPHORA, a bioinformatics software for metegenomics analysis

See also
 Anfora, the largest Mexican manufacturer of vitrified ceramics
 Anthora, a coffee cup design popular in New York City which depicts an amphora